Sword of Destiny may refer to:

 Sword of Destiny (short story collection) (1992 book) anthology of short stories set in The Witcher fictional universe, by Andrzej Sapkowski
 Sword of Destiny (2016 film), Netflix film sequel to Crouching Tiger, Hidden Dragon, part of the Crane-Iron wuxia franchise
 Sword of Destiny ("Arrested Development" episode), 2005 season 2 number 15 episode 37 of Arrested Development

See also
 Sword of state
 Excalibur (disambiguation)
 Magic sword (disambiguation)
 The Sword in the Stone (disambiguation)
 Spear of Destiny (disambiguation)
 Destiny (disambiguation)